Samuel Lonzo Hoskin (born December 29, 1979) is an American-Lebanese former professional basketball player.

Career 
Hoskin was born in Detroit, Michigan. He played his high school basketball at Bishop Borgess High School in Detroit.  Hoskin played collegiately at Eastern Kentucky University and at De Paul University located in Chicago, Illinois and was voted second team All-USA in 2003.

In the 2003–04 season Hoskin was the last cut by the Seattle SuperSonics. Afterward he played in Israel and became one of the top scores and rebounders in the Israel Basketball League. He later played in Russia for clubs Ural Great Perm and Dynamo Moscow Region and became one of the top scorers and rebounders in the Russian league as well. Hoskin also played for Olympiacos and Cibona both Euroleague teams located in Athens, Greece and Zagreb, Croatia respectively.

Hoskin won a championship with club Champville SC in Lebanon.

In August 2012, Hoskin signed with Jilin Northeast Tigers for the 2012–13 CBA season.

In June 2017, Hoskin retired from professional basketball and become an assistant coach and coach of player development in China at the Zhejiang Golden Bulls.

References

External links
 NBA.com Profile

1979 births
Living people
American expatriate basketball people in Argentina
American expatriate basketball people in Croatia
American expatriate basketball people in China
American expatriate basketball people in Egypt
American expatriate basketball people in Greece
American expatriate basketball people in Iran
American expatriate basketball people in Israel
American expatriate basketball people in Lebanon
American expatriate basketball people in Russia
American expatriate basketball people in Uruguay
American expatriate basketball people in Venezuela
American men's basketball players
Basketball players from Detroit
BC Zenit Saint Petersburg players
Bnei HaSharon players
Centers (basketball)
Club Malvín basketball players
DePaul Blue Demons men's basketball players
Eastern Kentucky Colonels men's basketball players
Hapoel Galil Elyon players
Israeli Basketball Premier League players
Jilin Northeast Tigers players
Junior college men's basketball players in the United States
KK Cibona players
Lanús basketball players
Marinos B.B.C. players
Olympiacos B.C. players
PBC Ural Great players
Power forwards (basketball)
Schoolcraft College alumni
Bishop Borgess High School alumni